Elbingian was a subdialect of Low Prussian spoken in East Prussia and West Prussia in the region of the , north of Elbląg. It had a border with Oberländisch, Mundart des Kürzungsgebiets, and Nehrungisch. It is related to Plautdietsch, which has far more speakers. The 1882 edition of dictionary of dialects Preußisches Wörterbuch includes Mundart der Elbinger Höhe using this wording.

Phonology 
There was a border of /i, e and ar/ becoming /e, a and or/ respectively in its area. It has many features in common with Natangian.

References

Bibliography 

 
 

East Prussia
West Prussia
Low Prussian dialect
Languages of Poland